Armando Lucio Walle Jr. (born March 7, 1978) is a representative in the Texas House of Representatives, representing the 140th district in Houston, Texas. Walle is the Deputy Floor Leader of the Texas House Democrats.  Walle was named Harris County COVID-19 Pandemic Recovery Czar by Harris County Judge Lina Hidalgo.

Early life and education
Walle was born and raised in Houston; he was the oldest of five children. While in high school, Walle worked at a taquería and interned for Houston Councilwoman Carol Mimms Galloway. Walle also played football in middle school and high school, and credits his football coach as a major inspiration for his desire to be a role model. Walle graduated from MacArthur High School and earned a B.S. in political science from the University of Houston. Armando is married to Debbie Dimas Walle, and has one son, Armando Pedro Walle. As of 2013, Walle was pursuing a J.D. from the University of Houston.

Texas House of Representatives
Walle worked for US Representatives Gene Green and Sheila Jackson Lee prior to being elected to the Texas House of Representatives. Walle left his job with Green to take on nine-term incumbent Democrat Kevin Bailey, ultimately upsetting the incumbent in the Democratic primary. With no Republican opponent in the general election, Walle took office in 2009. Walle serves as Deputy Floor Leader of his caucus, and serves on the Business & Industry Committee, serves as Vice Chair of the Land & Resource Management Committee, and serves on the Federalism & Fiscal Responsibility Committee.

In 2013, Walle supported the protests of Houston fast food workers seeking higher wages.

References

External links
Vote Smart profile

1978 births
Living people
Politicians from Houston
University of Houston alumni
Democratic Party members of the Texas House of Representatives
21st-century American politicians